The Regatta is a mixed development complex of 11 skyscrapers overlooking the Java Sea at Pluit, Jakarta, Indonesia. The complex has a land area of about 11 hectares. There is a 2.4 hectares aqua park within the complex.

The tallest of the towers is a hotel building, which is 163 meters tall and 40 floors above the ground. The concept of the development follows a nautical theme, the centerpiece of which being an aerodynamically shaped hotel overlooking the Java Sea with chic lines is a series of 10 apartment towers of same design, symbolizing of tall ships sailing around the ‘lighthouse’ represented by the hotel, which gave to the name ‘Regatta’. The development won FIABCI (International Real Estate Federation) Prix d'Excellence Awards in 2010.

All apartment towers are named after major port cities of the world and are each orientated towards the cardinal direction of their corresponding city.

See also

Pluit
North Jakarta
Java Sea

External links
website

References

Buildings and structures in Jakarta
Post-independence architecture of Indonesia
Skyscrapers in Indonesia
Residential skyscrapers in Indonesia
Skyscraper hotels